Jeremy Gan Wye Teck (born 24 January 1979) is a Malaysian former badminton player, who now works as a badminton coach.
Gan was a boys' doubles gold medalist at the 1996 World Junior Championships, and 1997 Asian Junior Championships partnered with Chan Chong Ming. Gan was part of the national team that won the men's team bronze at the 1998 Asian Games in Bangkok. Gan resigned from the Badminton Association of Malaysia in 2017, and moved as the mixed doubles coach at the Nippon Badminton Association starting in January 2018.

Achievements

World Junior Championships 
Boys' doubles

Asian Junior Championships 
Boys' doubles

IBF International 
Men's doubles

References

External links
 

1979 births
Living people
People from Malacca
Badminton coaches
Malaysian sportspeople of Chinese descent
Malaysian male badminton players
Badminton players at the 1998 Asian Games
Asian Games bronze medalists for Malaysia
Asian Games medalists in badminton
Medalists at the 1998 Asian Games